Maurizio Bidinost (born 10 January 1959) is a retired Italian cyclist who was active on the road and track between 1979 and 1986, turning professional in 1981. On track, he won one silver and three bronze medals in the individual and team pursuit events at the world championships of 1979–1982 and the Six-day races of Nouméa (1980 and 1981) and Berlin (1982).

References

1959 births
Living people
Italian male cyclists
People from the Province of Pordenone
Cyclists from Friuli Venezia Giulia
Italian track cyclists